Stade des Flandres ( ‘Stadium of Flanders’) is an indoor sporting arena located in Dunkerque, France. The capacity of the arena is 2,500 people.  It is currently home to the Dunkerque Handball Grand Littoral team.

Salle Louis Dewerdt (or salle Dewerdt for short) was its original name. Louis Dewerdt was a local city councillor of the centre-right Union for French Democracy.  means "hall", i.e., a sports hall, or indoor arena.

References

Handball venues in France
Indoor arenas in France
Sports venues in Nord (French department)
Sport in Dunkirk